

The Bachelor Girl is a novel by Victor Margueritte first published in 1922. An English translation was first published in 1923 by Alfred A. Knopf. It deals with the life of a young woman who, upon learning that her fiancé is cheating on her, decides to live life freely and on her own terms. Amongst other things, this included having multiple sexual partners, both male and female. The title translates as The Tomboy. The title addresses the somewhat ambiguous realm between definite gender roles, e.g. where a Judeo-Christian patriarchal society might place a free-thinking, free-living woman in its social strata.

Although the theme is not particularly shocking in the present day, at the time it was considered quite scandalous; it even caused the author to lose his Legion of Honour. It has been adapted into a film four times, the most notably in 1936.

See also
Flapper

Notes

References

External links 
Full text online

1922 French novels
Feminist novels
Feminism in France
Novels with bisexual themes
French novels adapted into films